Tropical acne is unusually severe acne occurring in the tropics during seasons when the weather is hot and humid.

Skin conditions including acne are seen with more frequency in dermatological consultations in hot and humid climates, where bacterial and fungal infections are more common, than in drier climates.

See also 
 List of cutaneous conditions

References

External links 
 Understanding Acne Blemishes with a Skin Specialist

Acneiform eruptions